James McCluskey (born February 10, 1988) is an American football fullback who is currently a free agent. He signed with the Oakland Raiders as an undrafted free agent in 2011.

College career 

After redshirting the 2006-2007 season at Boston College, McCluskey emerged as the Eagles' starting fullback his freshman year, finishing the season with 2 catches for 13 yards and 8 carries for 14 yards and 3 touchdowns.  During the 2008 season, McCluskey started the first 9 games before breaking his leg against Notre Dame, ending his season with 19 catches for 123 yards and rushing 23 times for 84 yards and a touchdown.  In 2009, after recovering from an Achilles tear, McCluskey appeared in 8 games.  Off the field, he and a teammate formed the Boston College chapter of Uplifting Athletes, raising thousands of dollars for cancer awareness and research. McCluskey was named team captain his senior year and appeared in all 13 games.

Professional career 

After the NFL lockout was lifted, McCluskey was signed as a free agent to the Oakland Raiders.  During camp, he was placed on injured reserve and eventually released.

Personal 

McCluskey is a 2006 graduate of Billerica Memorial High School and a 2010 graduate of Boston College's Carroll School of Management. James is the son of Nancy McCluskey and has two younger sisters named Audrey and Alyica

References

1988 births
Living people
American football fullbacks
Oakland Raiders players
People from Billerica, Massachusetts
Sportspeople from Lowell, Massachusetts
Players of American football from Massachusetts